Kieran Offord (born 28 March 2004) is a Scottish professional footballer who plays as a striker for Scottish Premiership club St Mirren.

Club career
After coming through the youth ranks at St Mirren, Offord joined Lowland League side East Stirlingshire on loan in December 2021. He scored on his debut against Dalbeattie Star. He also featured against Celtic B.

On 22 December 2021, Offord was recalled and made his St Mirren debut in a 0–0 draw with Celtic in the Scottish Premiership. He was brought into the squad due to a COVID-19 outbreak in the squad and played on the right wing. He made a second appearance days later on 26 December, coming on as a late substitute against Rangers.

On 28 December 2021, Offord was back in the East Stirlingshire side.

In the summer of 2022, Offord returned to the St Mirren first team. He scored in a friendly against Crusaders and started in a 2-0 League Cup win over Cowdenbeath.

In September 2022, Offord joined Alloa Athletic on a season-long loan. He scored on his debut against Clyde. On 20 January 2023, Offord was recalled by St Mirren.

International career
In October 2019, Offord was called up to the Scotland national under-16 football team. He scored twice on his debut against the Repilic of Ireland.

In November 2021, Offord was called up to the Scotland national under-19 squad to play in Croatia.

References

2004 births
Living people
Scottish footballers
Association football forwards
Scotland youth international footballers
Scottish Professional Football League players
Lowland Football League players
St Mirren F.C. players
East Stirlingshire F.C. players
Alloa Athletic F.C. players